The Bill Whitehead Award is an annual literary award, presented by Publishing Triangle to honour lifetime achievement by writers within the LGBT community. First presented in 1989, the award was named in honour of Bill Whitehead, an editor with E. P. Dutton and Macmillan Publishers who died in 1987. The award is given to a woman in even-numbered years and a man in odd-numbered years.

Winners

References

External links
 

Triangle Awards
Literary awards honoring lifetime achievement
Awards established in 2006